Pambio is a village and former municipality in the District of Lugano, in the canton of Ticino in southern Switzerland.

History
The village, formerly a municipality,  in 1904 was merged with neighboring Noranco to constitute the new Municipality of Pambio-Noranco.

In 2004 the Municipality of Pambio-Noranco was incorporated into the larger, neighboring municipality and city of Lugano, and became a district−quarter of Lugano.

Lugano
Villages in Switzerland
Former municipalities of Ticino